Databending (or data bending) is the process of manipulating a media file of a certain format, using software designed to edit files of another format. Distortions in the medium typically occur as a result, and the process is frequently employed in glitch art.

Process and techniques
The term databending is derived from circuit bending, in which objects such as children's toys, effects pedals and electronic keyboards are deliberately short circuited by bending the circuit board to produce erratic and spontaneous sounds. Like circuit bending, databending involves the (often unpredictable) alteration of its target's behavior. Databending achieves this alteration by manipulating the information within a media file of a certain format, using software designed to edit files of a different format; distortions in the medium typically occur as a result.  

Many techniques exist, including the use of hex editors to manipulate certain components of a compression algorithm, to comparatively simple methods. Michael Betancourt has posed a short set of instructions, included in the Signal Culture Cookbook, that involves the direct manipulation of the digital file using a hexadecimal editing program. One such method involves the addition of audio effects through audio editing software to distort raw data interpretations of image files. Some effects produce optical analogues: adding an echo filter duplicated elements of a photo, and inversion contributed to the flipping over of an image. The similarities result from the waveforms corresponding with the layers of pixels in a linear fashion, ordered from top to bottom. Another method, dubbed "the WordPad effect", uses the program WordPad to manipulate images through converting the raw data to the Rich Text Format.

Categorization
According to the artist Benjamin Berg, different techniques of the process can be grouped into three categories:
 Incorrect editing: Files of a certain format are manipulated using software designed to edit files of a different format.
 Reinterpretation: Files are simply converted from one medium to another.
 Forced errors: Known software bugs are exploited to force the program to terminate, usually while writing a file.
The "WordPad effect" would fall under incorrect editing, while reinterpretation contains a subcategory called sonification, in which data other than audio is introduced simultaneously with musical audio data. The last technique is the hardest of the three to accomplish, often yielding highly unpredictable results.

Usage and reception

Databending is frequently employed in glitch art, and is considered a sub-category of the genre. The sonification technique is commonly used by glitch musicians such as Alva Noto. Ahuja and Lu summarized the process through a quote by Adam Clark Estes of Gizmodo as "the internet's code-heavy version of graffiti." Various groups on Flickr explore the effects of databending on imagery; an Internet bot named "GlitchBot" was created to scrape Creative Commons-licensed imagery and apply the process and upload the results. Users on Vimeo who deal explicitly with databending and glitch art in general exist, and a Chicago-based digital art project named GLI.TC/H was funded using Kickstarter in 2011.

See also
 Compression artifact

References

External links
  A Simple Protocol for Databending by Michael Betancourt
 Glitch art application by Georg Fischer
 
 Official website of GLI.TC/H
 Databending using Audacity by Antonio Roberts

Artistic techniques
Computer errors
Computer graphic techniques
Digital electronics
Film and video technology
New media
Software anomalies
Software bugs